Santa Clara Pueblo (in Tewa: Khaʼpʼoe Ówîngeh [xɑ̀ʔp’òː ʔówîŋgè]) ″Singing Water Village″, also known as ″Village of Wild Roses″ is a census-designated place (CDP) in Rio Arriba County, New Mexico, United States and a federally recognized tribe of Native American Pueblo people.

The pueblo is a member of the Eight Northern Pueblos, and the people are from the Tewa ethnic group of Native Americans who speak the Rio Grande Tewa language. The pueblo is on the Rio Grande, between Ohkay Owingeh (formerly San Juan Pueblo) to the north and San Ildefonso Pueblo (P'ohwhóge Owingeh) to the south.

Santa Clara Pueblo is famous for producing hand-crafted pottery, specifically blackware and redware with deep engravings. The pueblo is listed on the National Register of Historic Places.

Geography
Santa Clara Pueblo is located at  (35.971124, -106.089111), approximately 1.5 miles south of Española on NM 30.

According to the United States Census Bureau, the CDP has a total area of 2.1 square miles (5.4 km), all land.

Demographics

The 2010 census found that 1,018 people lived in the CDP, while 1,182 people in the United States reported being exclusively Santa Claran and 1,425 people reported being Santa Claran exclusively or in combination with another group.

History

Tewa people lived in the Pueblo area for millennia before they met Spanish conquistador Juan de Oñate and his exploration party on July 11, 1598. Pueblo archaeology shows that Ancestral Puebloans lived in the general region as far back as 1200 BC.

First visited in 1541, a segment of Francisco Coronado's expeditionary force met with the residents of the nearby Caypa Pueblo. After annexation of the region into the Spanish Kingdom, and as part of the 1601 expansion of Oñate's colonial capital, a chapel was built there by 1617. Fray Alonso de Benavides established a mission in 1628. The mission was abandoned on the lead up to the Great Pueblo Revolt of 1680.

This Pueblo joined forces with others nearby and fought against the Spanish Royal Government in 1680 in the revolt. The original and unoccupied chapel was destroyed. Two other chapel buildings would be constructed there. The current church replaced the former in 1918.

In 1782, a small pox outbreak decimated the population. The eighth section of the Act of July 22, 1854 mandated a census of the newly acquired possessions of the US government. In review of the land's title, the pueblo presented a Spanish Royal decree dated October 15, 1713 that the title to land and various pueblos could be expected. Though lost, the decree on the title papers assured protection of the pueblos' right to protection of their homelands from encroachment. The result of the title research led this Pueblo community to be of the first recognized by United States Congress.

Education
It is in the Española Public Schools district. The comprehensive public high school is Española Valley High School.

There is a Bureau of Indian Education (BIE)-affiliated tribal elementary school, Kha'p'o Community School, in Santa Clara Pueblo.

Arts 
Among the arts practiced at Santa Clara Pueblo, pottery is one of the most well-known. Traditionally, pottery was made primarily by girls and women, and while many potters today are women, there are many men who make pottery as well. Santa Clara Pueblo potters are known for their black polished and red polished pottery in a distinctive style, especially the use of incised work. "Knife-wing" or eagle feather designs are common on Santa Clara pottery There are a number of well-known ceramic artists from Santa Clara. Four approaches are used in the decoration of the majority of Santa Clara Pueblo ceramics: painted designs, impressed patterns, incised designs, and resist-firing with incised or sgraffito designs.

Notable tribal members and residents

 Angela Baca, matriarch of the Santa Clara melon potters
 Gregory Cajete, author and educator
 Tammy Garcia, ceramic artist and sculptor
 Luther Gutierrez, potter
 Margaret Gutierrez, potter
 Joseph Lonewolf, potter
 Nora Naranjo Morse, artist and filmmaker
 Linda and Merton Sisneros, potters
 Paul Speckled Rock, potter and bronze sculptor, gallery owner
 Anita Louise Suazo, traditional potter
 Roxanne Swentzell, ceramic and bronze sculptor, Native plant activist
Rose B. Simpson, mixed-media, ceramic, and performance artist
 Margaret Tafoya, Santa Clara traditional potter
 Pablita Velarde, Santa Clara painter
 Nathan Youngblood, potter

See also

 Puye Cliff Dwellings - the ruins of an abandoned pueblo and National Historic Landmark managed by Santa Clara Pueblo.
 Santa Clara Indian Reservation
 National Register of Historic Places listings in Rio Arriba County, New Mexico

References

External links
 Indian Pueblo Cultural Center - Santa Clara Pueblo
 Santa Clara Pueblo Community Library
 Santa Clara Pueblo at National Park Service
 Santa Clara Pueblo pottery gallery
 Children of the Clay: A Family of Pueblo Potters, the Swentzell family of Santa Clara Pueblo

 01
Census-designated places in Rio Arriba County, New Mexico
Tewa
Native American tribes in New Mexico
Puebloan peoples
Northern Rio Grande National Heritage Area
Historic districts on the National Register of Historic Places in New Mexico
National Register of Historic Places in Rio Arriba County, New Mexico
Census-designated places in New Mexico